Nashville is an American musical drama television series. It was created by Academy Award winner Callie Khouri and produced by R.J. Cutler, Khouri, Dee Johnson, Steve Buchanan and Connie Britton. The series stars Connie Britton as Rayna Jaymes, a legendary country music superstar whose stardom is beginning to fade, and Hayden Panettiere as rising star Juliette Barnes. The series premiered on ABC on October 10, 2012. In May 2016, ABC canceled the series after four seasons; however, the next month, CMT picked the series up for a fifth season.

The pilot episode received much acclaim from critics, specifically praising Khouri's writing, casting, and the performances of Britton and Panettiere. Britton was nominated for the 2012 Golden Globe Award for Best Actress – Television Series Drama and the Primetime Emmy Award for Outstanding Lead Actress in a Drama Series, and Panettiere for Golden Globe Award for Best Supporting Actress, while the series was nominated for Favorite New TV Drama at the 39th People's Choice Awards, for Best Screenplay at 2013 Writers Guild of America Award and four Satellite Awards. Panettiere received a second Best Supporting Actress nomination at the 71st Golden Globe Awards. At the 6th Critics' Choice Television Awards, Panettiere was nominated for Best Supporting Actress in a Drama Series and Jonathan Jackson was nominated for Best Supporting Actor in a Drama Series.

On November 17, 2017, it was confirmed that the sixth season would be the series' final season.

Series overview

Episodes

Season 1 (2012–13)

Season 2 (2013–14)

Season 3 (2014–15)

Season 4 (2015–16)

Season 5 (2016–17)

Season 6 (2017–18)

Specials

References

External links

Episodes
Lists of American drama television series episodes